St Michael and All Angels Church is an Anglican church in the town of Southwick in the district of Adur, one of seven local government districts in the English county of West Sussex.  Some Saxon-era structural work is still visible despite rebuilding work in the 12th and 13th centuries and in more recent times; and a church may have existed on the site as early as the 10th century—before the ancient settlement of Southwick even took that name.  The church has been damaged by fire and bombing, but is still in active use as the area's parish church.  English Heritage has listed it at Grade II* for its architectural and historical importance.

History
The Romans settled in the area now known as Southwick: a large villa was in use for nearly 300 years until the 4th century, but no more development took place until the late Saxon era.  The earliest record of the name "Southwick" came in 1073, when it was part of the large manor of Kingston Buci estate to the west.  This covered several nearby settlements as well as the village of Kingston Buci, and may have been founded as a Celtic estate.

A church from earlier in the Saxon era—probably a wooden structure—stood on the site of the present building earlier in the Saxon era, but by the time of the Domesday survey in 1086 a stone structure was in place.  Southwick was not identified as a separate entity in the Domesday Book, and the church was almost certainly controlled by St Julian's Church in Kingston Buci.  In the late 12th century or 1225 (sources differ), the advowson was conveyed to the Knights Templar, who by this time were also patrons of the Church of St Mary the Blessed Virgin in nearby Sompting.  It was then transferred to another religious order, the Knights Hospitaller, in around 1365 before becoming Crown property after the Dissolution of the Monasteries in the 16th century.

As built in the 11th century, the church had a nave, chancel and tower at the west end.  The lowest level of the tower, incorporating the entrance doorway, remains from that era.  All three stages of the tower were originally thought to have been Saxon, but later analysis has determined that the middle and upper stages date from the late 12th or early 13th century.

Around the same time, the rest of the church was rebuilt.  The nave was renewed and had an aisle and chapel added on the south side, and the chancel was remodelled twice (first in about 1130, and again in the 13th century when lancet windows were added).  A chancel arch and wooden chancel screen followed in the 14th century.  A porch was in place in the early 17th century, and may have replaced the aisle and chapel on that side.

A fire destroyed the nave and roof in 1830, although the chancel and tower were undamaged.  Architect John Garrett designed a new four-bay nave with north and south aisles in a lean-to style, rounded arches and lancet windows in groups of three.  A vestry and a replacement for the old south chapel were built later in the 19th century.

The churchyard was extended in the late 19th century, and a lychgate was added in 1908.

The church was hit by a bomb during a Second World War bombing raid on 21 February 1941.  Although it did not explode, it travelled through the tower and wrecked it.  A bomb disposal unit failed to find the bomb despite extensive digging, and ordered the tower to be demolished because it was structurally unsound and they needed to widen their search area.  Because of the tower's historical and architectural value, it was taken down stone by stone and stored so it could be restored and re-erected later.  In January 1943, two years after the bombing, the bomb disposal team found the device embedded under the churchyard by the outside wall of the north aisle.  It was removed, defused and put on display inside the church for a time.

After the war ended, the War Damage Commission paid for the tower to be rebuilt.  The individually numbered stones and timbers were retrieved, and in 1949 John Denman executed a precise rebuilding of all three stages and the broached spire.  He also built vestries on both sides.

Architecture

St Michael and All Angels Church is a flint-built structure with dressings of stone.  Most of the flint has been renewed, although there is still some 11th-century work around the entrance door.  The roof is laid with a combination of flat tiles and pantiles.

The three-stage tower, topped with its shingled spire, stands at the west end between two vestries with rounded walls.  The entrance is in the lowest stage of the tower; above it the roofline of the original 11th-century church can be discerned.  Inside is the nave with its north and south aisles and south chapel (now used to house the organ), and the chancel with a restored chancel arch (originally built in the Norman era using clunch, a common building material in Sussex).  In the north wall of the chancel, a 14th-century aumbry can be discerned.

The tower has rounded-headed windows in its middle stage and tall, much narrower rounded lancets in the upper stage.  The lancet windows in the chancel, inserted in the 13th century, underwent 19th-century restoration and have stained glass by Charles Eamer Kempe. The nave also has lancets, put in during the 1835 rebuilding, and several windows in the aisles were installed as memorials during the Victorian era.  The east window is contemporary, and its stained glass may be by the Clayton and Bell firm.  Ken Adams of the Cox & Barnard firm of Hove designed a memorial window for the north aisle in about 1950, showing the Presentation of Jesus at the Temple.

Internal fittings include an elaborately carved pulpit with some early 17th-century panels, an organ restored in the mid-1970s and a substantial square font which is believed to date from the 13th century.

The church today
St Michael and All Angels Church was listed at Grade II* by English Heritage on 19 July 1950.  Such buildings are defined as being "particularly important ... [and] of more than special interest".  As of February 2001, it was one of six Grade II* listed buildings, and 119 listed buildings of all grades, in Adur district.

The mid 70s saw changes to the interior. The Lady chapel altar was removed, and the organ was moved from its location in the south transept to a purpose built gallery at the rear of the church. Regrettably rather than extend the tonal range of the instrument, electric action allowed octave couplers, and some of the original stops were renamed but not revoiced. The instrument supports congregational singing, but is no longer useful for accompanying choral works.

Memorial plaques were removed from the original oak case and not re-sited. Choir numbers dwindled as did the number of services they sing at.

The current website for the church states that it is a vibrant community of about 250. This reflects much reduced attendance from its heyday, when Sunday Eucharist would attract congregations of 400.

The parish is shaped like a right-angled triangle whose longest side runs from north to south.  Shoreham Harbour and the English Channel form the southern boundary; the eastern side corresponds with the ancient boundary between the Rapes of Bramber and Lewes (now the boundary between Adur district and the city of Brighton and Hove, and also between West Sussex and East Sussex); and the western boundary was created in 1848 when Kingston Lane was built to form the eastern limit of Kingston Buci parish.

Until 2008, there were two other active Anglican churches in the parish, both of which were administered from St Michael and All Angels Church.  In Fishersgate—a mostly early 20th-century residential and industrial area in the far southeast of the parish—the Church of St Peter and St Mary was built in 1938 to replace a mission chapel of 1881.  The Romanesque red-brick building had a squat tower and spire.  The Diocese of Chichester declared it redundant in 2008, and has been converted into a facility for use by community groups.  In the north of the parish, the All Souls Centre was in use for Anglican worship until the same year.  It was built in 1955, but the Church Army had a presence on the site earlier.  In 2008, it was closed and sold for redevelopment.

See also
List of places of worship in Adur

References

Notes

Bibliography

Church of England church buildings in West Sussex
Grade II* listed churches in West Sussex
Adur District